Cryphia amseli is a moth of the family Noctuidae. It is probably endemic to the arid part of the Jordan Rift Valley. It is known only from the type locality: Israel, Jericho, April 1952. It has not been observed since.

There is probably one generation per year.

External links
The Acronictinae, Bryophilinae, Hypenodinae and Hypeninae of Israel

Cryphia
Moths of the Middle East
Moths described in 1952